This bibliography of sobriety books is a list of written and published works about the virtues of abstinence, the titles listed here are limited to self-help and memoir books about recovery from alcohol and drug addiction, published by notable authors and publishers.

Books about sobriety

See also 
Sobriety

References 

Sobriety books
Sobriety